ICRM may refer to:

 International Red Cross and Red Crescent Movement, an international humanitarian movement
 International Cliff Richard Movement, a fan club for English musician Cliff Richard
 Institute of Certified Records Managers, a certifying body in the Records Management and Information Governance industry